Partners-N-Crime is a rap group from New Orleans, Louisiana, made up of Kango Slimm (born Walter Williams) and Mr. Meana (born Michael Patterson), friends raised in the 17th ward of New Orleans, where they met in high school through a mutual friend.  The two earned a local buzz performing at various New Orleans talent shows, and eventually signed to Big Boy Records. A rivalry between Partners-N-Crime and Cash Money Records group U.N.L.V. led to further hostilities between Big Boy and Cash Money before the two groups made peace.

The group is considered legendary to locals. The music that they play is in a style that is all their own, and the people of New Orleans love it. Mr. Meana believes that his fans are fanatics, and love the music. The music is different from regular New Orleans bounce music in that they are able to rap to it. It is their own unique style that there is none other of. The group has gone on tour all of the United States, including the Virgin Islands.

Partners-N-Crime had widespread success in Louisiana with their single "Let the Good Times Roll", a song that discusses the social change in the black community in the year 1994. This year was one of the most violent years in New Orleans, the "City of Social Justice". "Pump the Party" was also produced in 1994. PNC eventually created their own imprint Crime Lab Entertainment, a division of fellow New Orleanian rapper Juvenile's UTP label.

Kango Slimm and Mr. Meana are now artists on their own label, H.I.T.Z. International. Mr. Meana is Vice-President of H.I.T.Z. International and in that role, he handles artist development for all artists on his label. Kango Slimm is also President of a company called "Beats & Hooks", where he provides features, hooks and much more.

Discography
1994: P.N.C
1995: Partners-N-Crime Featuring Prime Time - Pump Tha Party (Puttin' In Work) 
1995: PNC 3
1997: Whatcha Wanna Do?
1999: We Be Hound'n
2001: World Premiere
2006: Club Bangaz
2009: We Are Legends
2014: The Lost Tapes

References

American hip hop groups
Southern hip hop groups
Musical groups from New Orleans
American musical duos
Hip hop duos